Paduka Sri Maharaja was the eldest son of Sri Rana Wikrama and the fourth Raja of Singapura. He was known as Damia Raja before his accession. According to Malay Annals, the reign of Sri Maharaja was marked with the event of swordfish ravaging the coast of Singapura. A young boy, Hang Nadim, thought of an ingenious solution to fend off the swordfish. The king was initially grateful, but felt increasingly threatened by the boy's intelligence, and ordered to have the boy executed; Hang Nadim's blood is said to have permanently stained the ground red, giving rise to the term "Tanah Merah" for Singapore's lateritic soils. In 1389, Sri Maharaja was succeeded by his son, Iskandar Shah, who is commonly identified with Parameswara, the founder of the Melaka Sultanate.

References

Rajas of Singapore
14th-century monarchs in Asia
Hindu monarchs
Malaysian Hindus
History of Malaysia
History of Singapore
1389 deaths